This is a list of members of the Victorian Legislative Council from the elections of 13 September 1900 to the elections of 12 September 1901. Several members resigned from the Council in 1901 to become members of the newly formed Parliament of Australia.

From 1889 there were fourteen Provinces and a total of 48 members.

Note the "Term in Office" refers to that members term(s) in the Council, not necessarily for that Province.

Henry Wrixon was President of the Council.

 Cooke resigned in March 1901 to take a seat in the new Federal Parliament; replaced by Walter Manifold in June 1901.
 Fraser resigned in March 1901 to become a senator in the new Federal Parliament; replaced by Edmund Smith in June 1901.
 Knox resigned in March 1901 to take a seat in the new Federal Parliament; replaced by Duncan McBryde in June 1901.
 Osmand died 11 March 1901; replaced by Steuart Gladstone Black in March 1901.
 Phillips resigned in March 1901 to take a seat in the new Federal Parliament; replaced by Henry Williams in June 1901.
 Sargood resigned in March 1901 to become a senator in the new Federal Parliament; replaced by Thomas Henry Payne in June 1901.
 Williamson resigned around May 1901; replaced by Hans Irvine in July 1901.
 Winter-Irving died 28 June 1901; replaced by William Baillieu in August 1901.
 Zeal resigned in March 1901 to become a senator in the new Federal Parliament; replaced by William Gray in June 1901.

References

 Re-member (a database of all Victorian MPs since 1851).

Members of the Parliament of Victoria by term
20th-century Australian politicians
19th-century Australian politicians